The secretary of state of Minnesota is a constitutional officer in the executive branch of government of the U.S. State of Minnesota. Twenty-two individuals have held the office of secretary of state since statehood. The incumbent is Steve Simon, a DFLer.

Election and term of office
The secretary of state is elected by the people on Election Day in November, and takes office on the first Monday of the next January. There is no limit to the number of terms a secretary of state may hold. To be elected secretary of state, a person must be qualified voter, permanently resident in the state of Minnesota at least 30 days prior to the election, and at least 21 years of age.

In the event of a vacancy in the office of the secretary of state, the governor may appoint a successor to serve the balance of the term. The secretary of state may also be recalled by the voters or removed from office through an impeachment trial.

Powers and duties
The secretary of state is keeper of the Great Seal as prescribed by the Minnesota Constitution. As such, the secretary of state files, certifies, and preserves in his or her office the enrolled laws of the Legislature, executive orders, commissions and proclamations issued by the governor, state agency rules, official oaths and bonds of state officials, and miscellaneous municipal boundary records. In connection with this role, the secretary of state also processes notary public applications and registers a variety of business associations, including corporations, cooperatives, limited liability companies, limited liability partnerships, limited partnerships, assumed business names, and trademarks. Additionally, a statewide computerized network jointly maintained by the Office of the Secretary of State and county recorders allows the public to file and search Uniform Commercial Code and tax lien records throughout the state.

Hand in hand with business registration and the safekeeping of government records, the secretary of state also administers the open appointments process for state agencies and Safe at Home, Minnesota's address confidentiality program for survivors of domestic violence, sexual assault, stalking, and other types of crime. Moreover, the secretary of state annually publishes the Minnesota Legislative Manual, a compendium of federal, state, and local government information. Perhaps the most visible and significant duty of the Secretary of State, however, is the administration of Minnesota's election laws. The secretary of state is Minnesota's chief election officer and as such canvasses and certifies election returns and operates the statewide voter registration system, among other election administration duties.

Aside from these functional responsibilities, the secretary of state chairs the State Canvassing Board and is an ex officio member of the Executive Council, the State Board of Investment, and the governing board for the Minnesota Historical Society.

History
The office of secretary of state has existed since before the Minnesota Territory achieved statehood in 1858, and the responsibilities of the office have largely remained the same in the intervening years.

Territorial Secretaries

Secretaries of State
In 1886, elections were moved from odd years to even years. Beginning with the 1962 election, the term of the office increased from two to four years.
  

Chesterman served as Assistant Secretary of State under Mike Holm, and was appointed to the position upon Holm's death. He left office later that same year, and never stood for election.

Notes on Minnesota political party names
Minnesota Democratic-Farmer-Labor Party: On April 15, 1944, the state Democratic Party and the Minnesota Farmer-Labor Party merged and created the Minnesota Democratic-Farmer-Labor Party (DFL). It is affiliated with the national Democratic Party.
Republican Party of Minnesota: From November 15, 1975, to September 23, 1995, the name of the state Republican party was the Independent-Republican party (I-R). The party has always been affiliated with the national Republican Party.

See also
 List of company registers

References

External links
Elections & Voting